Cevizlibağ is a station on the Istanbul Metrobus Bus rapid transit line. It is located between the D.100 state highway in Zeytinburnu, Istanbul. The station is served by six of the seven metrobus routes and a terminus for two of them; 34A and 34C. Connection to the T1 tram line is available.

Cevizlibağ station was opened on 17 September 2007, as part of the original 16 stations of the Istanbul Metrobus system.

References

External links
Cevizlibağ station
Cevizlibağ in Google Street View

Istanbul Metrobus stations